Siebe Gorman & Co Ltd v Barclays Bank Ltd [1979] 2 Lloyd's Rep 142 is a UK insolvency law case, concerning the definition of a floating charge. It was an influential decision for many years, but is now outdated as authority in light of the House of Lords decision in Re Spectrum Plus Ltd.

Facts
Siebe Gorman, a diving equipment company, granted a debenture in favour of Barclays Bank to secure a loan. The document was expressed to create a ‘first fixed charge’ over all present and future book debts. It required Siebe Gorman to pay the proceeds of its book debts into a Barclays Bank account, and prohibited Siebe Gorman from creating any other charges on those book debts, or assigning the book debts to anyone else. So there was a prohibition on dealing with the book debts before collection of them. Barclays also had the right to obtain absolute control by giving notice, but that right was never exercised.

Judgment

Slade J held that it was a fixed charge. The restrictions on Siebe Gorman's power gave the bank enough control to be inconsistent with being a floating charge.

Authority

See also

UK company law
Floating charge
Voidable floating charge

Notes

References

United Kingdom insolvency case law
High Court of Justice cases
1979 in British law
1979 in case law
Barclays litigation